2013 Brasil Tennis Cup - Doubles was the first edition of a new event on the WTA Tour.  Anabel Medina Garrigues and Yaroslava Shvedova won the title, defeating Anne Keothavong and Valeria Savinykh in the final, 6–0, 6–4.

Seeds 

  Anabel Medina Garrigues /  Yaroslava Shvedova (champions)
  Petra Martić /  Kristina Mladenovic (first round)
  Tímea Babos /  Kimiko Date-Krumm (semifinals)
  Nina Bratchikova /  Oksana Kalashnikova (first round)

Draw

Draw

References 
 Main Draw

Brasil Tennis Cup - Doubles
2013 Doubles
Bra